Miguel Ángel García Granados (born 12 January 1952) is a Mexican politician from the Institutional Revolutionary Party. From 2009 to 2012 he served as Deputy of the LXI Legislature of the Mexican Congress representing Sinaloa.

References

1952 births
Living people
Politicians from Sinaloa
People from Mazatlán
Institutional Revolutionary Party politicians
21st-century Mexican politicians
Autonomous University of Sinaloa alumni
Academic staff of the Autonomous University of Sinaloa
Members of the Congress of Sinaloa
Deputies of the LXI Legislature of Mexico
Members of the Chamber of Deputies (Mexico) for Sinaloa